Agache is a surname. People with this surname include:

 Alexandru Agache (born 1955), Romanian baritone
 Alfred Agache (architect), Brazilian urban planner
 Alfred Agache (painter) (1843–1915), French painter
 Angel Agache (born 1976), Moldovan politician 
 Dragoș Agache (born 1984), Romanian swimmer
 Lavinia Agache, (born 1967), Romanian gymnast
 Roger Agache (1926–2011), French archaeologist

Agache may also refer to:
A tributary of the Sensée in northern France

See also
Agacher Strip War, border dispute between Burkina Faso and Mali - similar name